The 2011 BNP Paribas Open was a tennis tournament played at Indian Wells, California in March 2011. It was the 38th edition of the men's event (23rd for the women), known as the BNP Paribas Open, and was classified as an ATP World Tour Masters 1000 event on the 2011 ATP World Tour and a Premier Mandatory event on the 2011 WTA Tour. Both the men's and the women's events took place at the Indian Wells Tennis Garden in Indian Wells, California, United States from March 7 through March 20, 2011.

Tournament
 The 2011 BNP Paribas Open took place at the Indian Wells Tennis Garden from 7 to 20 March 2011. It was the 36th edition of the event. The tournament was jointly run by the Tennis Ventures Llc and was part of the 2011 ATP World Tour and the 2011 WTA Tour. On the ATP tour it was the first of the seasons Masters 1000 events; on the women's tour it was the season's first of four Premier Mandatory events. The tournament was conducted on eight outdoor Plexipave IW courts. This has been given a medium–slow court speed.

Events

Men's singles

The semifinals were a repeat of the 2009 US Open semis. It was also the first time since 1995 that all four players to reach this stage were Grand Slam champions. En route to the semifinal stage Djokovic broke the record of his Final opponent Nadal for the fewest games lost in the history of Indian Wells Masters as well as in the masters series based on four matches. He lost only 12 games to Golubev, Gulbis, Troicki, Gasquet respectively while Nadal lost 13 in the 2010 Monte-Carlo Rolex Masters. In Indian Wells Stefan Edberg held the previous record with 17 lost games while reaching the 1990 final. The results of the matches were a reverse of the US Open as Djokovic and Nadal won.

Championship match result

 Novak Djokovic def.  Rafael Nadal, 4–6, 6–3, 6–2

Women's singles

Before their quarter final match, Azarenka and Wozniacki led the crowd in a spontaneous tribute to the people of Japan, leading a period of silence as they came out on court with a Japanese flag. The players wrote on the flag a message for Japan; 'Our Thoughts Are With You.' The match itself only lasted three games as Azaerenka had to retire with a hip injury.

In the semifinals Bartoli created history as she became the first French woman to reach the final in Indian Wells. Bartoli reached the final losing just four games against Wickmayer. In the other half of the draw Wozniacki was equally dominant losing three games to Sharapova.

Championship match result

 Caroline Wozniacki def.  Marion Bartoli, 6–1, 2–6, 6–3

Men's doubles

Championship match result

 Alexandr Dolgopolov /  Xavier Malisse def.  Roger Federer /  Stanislas Wawrinka, 6–4, 6–7(5), [10–7]

Women's doubles

In the first round all the seeds made it safely through apart from second seeds Peschke and Srebotnik, who lost 10–5 in a match tiebreaker. To make it worse, Srebotnik took a hit to the eye leaving her with impaired vision for the rest of the match. While King and Shevdova won their first match back as a pairing and Bethanie Mattek–Sands pulled off a spectacular 'tweener' for a winner. The second round saw the World Number Ones, Dulko and Pennetta, exit the tournament. Also exiting in the second round was the Chang and Zheng; and number seven seeds Benesova and Strycova, who lost to Sania Mirza and Elena Vesnina.

The quarterfinals witnessed Hantuchová and Radwańska losing just one game against the reigning Wimbledon and US Open champions, while the third seeds Huber and Petrova exited in straight sets to Mettek–Sands and Shaughnessy. Azarenka and Kirilenko were responsible for sending home the wild card team of Jankovic and Pavlyuchenkova in straight sets. Mirza and Vesnina lost just four games against Hantuchová and Radwańska in the semifinals, whilst Mattek–Sands and Shaughnessy received a walkover against Azarenka and Kirilenko, due to a hip injury sustained by Azarenka. In the final Mirza and Vesnina lost just five games to win the title without dropping a set throughout the tournament.

Championship match result

 Sania Mirza /  Elena Vesnina def.  Bethanie Mattek-Sands /  Meghann Shaughnessy, 6–0, 7–5

Hawkeye
The 2011 BNP Paribas Open was the first tournament to have hawkeye technology used on more than three courts. Many tournaments before have had the technology on their show courts (usually only three courts at the Grand Slams) but the Indian Wells Tennis Garden had hawkeye on all eight of its courts.

Points and prize money

Point distribution

Prize money
All money is in US dollars

Players

Men's singles

Seeds

 Rankings are as of March 7, 2011.

Other entrants
The following players received wildcards into the main draw:
 Ričardas Berankis
 James Blake
 Ryan Harrison
 Milos Raonic
 Bernard Tomic

The following player received entry using a protected ranking into the main draw:
 Juan Martín del Potro

The following players received entry from the qualifying draw:

 Alex Bogomolov Jr.
 Rohan Bopanna
 Flavio Cipolla
 Rik de Voest
 Somdev Devvarman
 Matthew Ebden
 Chris Guccione
 Marinko Matosevic
 Michael Russell
 Tim Smyczek
 Ryan Sweeting
 Donald Young

Withdrawals
  Carlos Berlocq → replaced by  Rainer Schüttler
  Juan Carlos Ferrero → replaced by  Teymuraz Gabashvili
  Fernando González → replaced by  Kei Nishikori
  Tommy Haas → replaced by  Dustin Brown
  Gaël Monfils (wrist) → replaced by  Illya Marchenko
  David Nalbandian (torn hamstring & hernia) → replaced by  Marsel İlhan
  Sergiy Stakhovsky → replaced by  Björn Phau
  Mikhail Youzhny (back) → replaced by  Mischa Zverev

Women's singles

Seeds

 Rankings are as of February 28, 2011.

Other entrants
The following players received wildcards into the main draw:
 Jill Craybas
 Lauren Davis
 Vania King
 Christina McHale
 Sania Mirza
 Alison Riske
 Sloane Stephens
 Coco Vandeweghe

The following player received entry using a protected ranking into the main draw:
 Urszula Radwańska

The following players received entry from the qualifying draw:

 Sorana Cîrstea
 Alizé Cornet
 Misaki Doi
 Kirsten Flipkens
 Jamie Hampton
 Lucie Hradecká
 Nuria Llagostera Vives
 Rebecca Marino
 Monica Niculescu
 Tamira Paszek
 Laura Pous Tió
 Zhang Shuai

Withdrawals
  Alona Bondarenko → replaced by  Kristina Barrois
  Justine Henin (retired from tennis) → replaced by  Renata Voráčová
  Carla Suárez Navarro → replaced by  Zuzana Ondrášková
  Tamarine Tanasugarn → replaced by  Anabel Medina Garrigues
  Serena Williams (foot & continue to boycott event since 2001) → replaced by  Simona Halep
  Venus Williams (stomach muscle & continue to boycott event since 2001) → replaced by  Edina Gallovits-Hall

References

External links

Association of Tennis Professionals (ATP) tournament profile

 
BNP Paribas Open
BNP Paribas Open
2011
BNP Paribas Open
BNP Paribas Open